The Snack eel (Ethadophis merenda) is an eel in the family Ophichthidae (worm/snake eels). It was described by Richard Heinrich Rosenblatt and John E. McCosker in 1970. It is a marine, subtropical eel which is known from a single specimen discovered in Mexico, in the eastern central Pacific Ocean.

Due to the lack of multiple known specimens, and thereby an inability to acquire data on the ecology, habitat or threats faced by the species, the IUCN redlist currently lists the Snack eel as Data Deficient.

References

Ophichthidae
Fish described in 1970